Northern High School is a midsized, suburban public high school located at 653 S Baltimore Street, Dillsburg, Pennsylvania. It is part of the Northern York County School District. According to the National Center for Education Statistics, in the 2018–2019 school year, Northern High School Administration reported an enrollment of 1,001 pupils in grades 9th through 12th.

Extracurriculars
Northern High School students have access to a variety of clubs, activities and sports.

Activities
Northern High School provides a variety of traditional school activities:

Caring Team
DECA - international marketing program
Envirothon
FBLA
FFA
Key Club
Gay-Straight Alliance
History Club
Miranda Club
Mock Trial
Model UN
Musical Performance Groups
the PawPrint
National Art Honor Society
National Honor Society
Polar Thon
Spring Musical
Student Council
Tri-M Music Honor Society
World Language Honor Society
Yearbook

Athletics
There is an extensive year round athletics program.

Baseball
Basketball - Boys Varsity & JV
Basketball - Girls Varsity & JV
Cheerleading
Cross Country - Boys
Cross Country - Girls
Field Hockey
Football - Varsity & JV
Football - 9th Grade
Golf - Boys and Girls
Indoor Track and Field - Boys and Girls
Lacrosse - Boys
Lacrosse - Girls
Soccer - Boys
Soccer - Girls
Softball - Girls
Swimming & Diving - Boys and Girls
Tennis - Boys
Tennis - Girls
Track & Field Boys and Girls
VolleyBall - Boys
Volleyball - Girls
Wrestling

Notable alumni
Scott Perry, member of the Pennsylvania House of Representatives
 Anthony Lerew
 Brent Brockman, Professional Soccer Player
 Chris Kilmore
 Cody Eppley

References

External links
 https://web.archive.org/web/20111203122105/http://www.northernpolarbears.com/Northernhs.cfm?subpage=316043

Educational institutions in the United States with year of establishment missing
Public high schools in Pennsylvania
Schools in York County, Pennsylvania